Tothby is a hamlet less than  north from the town of Alford, in the East Lindsey district of Lincolnshire, England.

Today Tothby considered a deserted medieval village, and the only extant property is Tothby Manor House, a Grade II listed building dating from the mid-17th century with alterations around 1840. Built of red brick, the house stands behind a moated enclosure, the site of the early Tothby Manor, home of the founder of the 14th-century church of St Wilfrid, Alford. The Manor was bought by Sir Robert Christopher in the mid-17th century when the present farmhouse was first built.

References

External links

Hamlets in Lincolnshire
Deserted medieval villages in Lincolnshire
Alford, Lincolnshire